Owney (ca. 1887 – June 11, 1897), was a terrier mix adopted in the United States as the first unofficial postal mascot by the Albany, New York, post office about 1888. The Albany mail professionals recommended the dog to their Railway Mail Service colleagues, and he became a nationwide mascot for nine years (1888–97). He traveled throughout the 48 contiguous United States and voyaged around the world traveling over 140,000 miles in his lifetime as a mascot of the Railway Post Office and the United States Postal Service. He is best known for being the subject of commemorative activities, including a 2011 U.S. postage stamp.

Story

Unofficial mascot
Owney belonged to a clerk at the Albany post office who would often come with him to work.  Owney seemed to love the smell of the mail bags and would sleep on the bags. The clerk quit the Albany post office but knew that Owney was happier at the post office with the mail bags.

Owney usually slept on the mail bags, and when they were moved, Owney went with them. He was considered to be good luck by postal railway clerks, since no train he rode on was ever in a wreck. He was a welcome addition in any railway post office; he was a faithful guardian of railway mail and the bags it was carried in, and would not allow anyone other than mail clerks to touch the bags.

This was an important duty and Owney was well-situated for it, as the Albany train station was a key division point on the New York Central railroad system, one of the two largest railroads in the U.S. at that time. Mail trains from Albany rolled eastward to Boston, south to New York City, and westward to Buffalo, Cleveland, Toledo, Chicago, and points further west. As a contemporary book recounted: "The terrier 'Owney' travels from one end of the country to the other in the postal cars, tagged through, petted, talked to, looked out for, as a brother, almost. But sometimes, no matter what the attention, he suddenly departs for the south, the east, or the west, and is not seen again for months." In 1893 he was feared dead after having disappeared, but it turned out he was involved in an accident in Canada.

As Owney's trips grew longer, the postal clerks at Albany became concerned that the dog be identified, and, if necessary returned to them. They bought a dog collar with a metal tag that read: "Owney, Post Office, Albany, New York". To this collar, the various railway post offices that saw Owney added individual dog tags. The collar and tags made the mixed-breed terrier the unofficial mascot of the U.S. Railway Mail Service, and as shown by the 2011 postage stamp issued in his honor, his identifications became an essential element of his identity.

Owney received tags everywhere he went, and as he moved they jingled like sleigh bells. He received from Winnona Kilbridge of the Los Angeles Kennel Club a medal for "Best Traveled Dog" of 1893. Owney received in 1894 from a Mr. William Winter Wagner of Chicago a "Globe Trotter" medal. His collection of tags grew so large that United States Postmaster General John Wanamaker gave him a coat to display them all. Wanamaker also announced that Owney was then the Official Mascot of the Rail Mail Service. The actual number of dog tags and medals Owney received is unknown. Despite the jacket, the mass became impossible for the small dog to carry. Clerks would remove tags and forward them to Albany or Washington D.C. for safekeeping. One source suggests that 1,017 medals and tokens were bestowed upon the mascot. Some of these tags did not survive; the National Postal Museum currently has 372 Owney tags in its collections. Other Owney tokens, trinkets, and medals are also in the NPM collection and are displayed there.

One of Owney's services "Above and Beyond the Call of Duty" reported is when he stayed behind to protect a mail pouch that had accidentally fallen out of a wagon during a delivery route he was on. When the clerks returned to the main Post Office after the deliveries, not only was a bag of mail missing but so was Owney. They backtracked their steps and eventually found Owney lying on top of the mailbag. Owney guarded the mail pouch until someone from the Post Office showed up.

International mail
One of his more famous trips was to Montreal, Quebec, Canada. There the postmaster kept him in a kennel. A demand was sent to Albany, New York for payment for the $2.50 that was incurred in feeding him. The sum was collected, and Owney was sent back home.

The Universal Postal Union was created by treaty in 1874 to standardize the shipping and handling of international mail; adherence to this pact by an increasing number of countries around what was then called the "civilized world" made it possible to extend Owney's horizons a bit. In 1895, the terrier enjoyed an around-the-world trip, riding with mail bags aboard trains and steamships. Starting from Tacoma, Washington, on August 19, he traveled for four months throughout Asia and across Europe, before returning to New York City on December 23 and from thence to Albany. Upon his return during Christmas week, the Los Angeles Times reported that he visited Asia, North Africa, and the Middle East. Another report claimed the Emperor of Japan awarded the dog two passports and several medals bearing the Japanese coat of arms. Owney's triumphant return to American shores was covered by newspapers nationwide. Owney became world famous after the trip, even though he broke no speed records in doing it.

Death and honors

As Owney aged, Post Office management came to believe that his traveling days were over. Mail clerk J. M. Elben, of St. Louis, agreed to take him in, and the influential Chicago manager of the Railway Mail Service, using insulting language to refer to the "mongrel cur", asked his employees not to allow him to ride on future mail trains.

The exact details of the incident which led to Owney's death are unclear. Newspapers around the country carried the story of Owney's death. They reported that Owney had been ill and had become aggressive in his old age. In June 1897, after allegedly attacking a postal clerk and a U.S. Marshal in Toledo, Ohio, Owney was shot and killed on the orders of the local postmaster. The Chicago Tribune termed it "an execution". The contemporary accounts suggest that a postal clerk in Toledo chained Owney to a post in the corner of a basement at a post office in Toledo, which was not his normal treatment. That clerk then called in a reporter for the local paper to get a story. Owney may not have been used to that treatment and that may have contributed to his aggression. Whatever the reason, it is not disputed that Owney was put down in Toledo on 11 June 1897.

Owney's death made public that a gap existed between the workplace attitudes of U.S. postal clerks and their management, with the deceased dog serving as a focus of this gap. The 1890s were a foundational decade for the new discipline of scientific management, with consultants like Frederick Winslow Taylor seeking to help managers reduce what they saw as industrial inefficiencies by examining workers' "wasted time" and "slacking". Postal clerks used Owney's death, and the expressions of sadness contained in press obituaries in honor of the dog, to make a statement: "Postal clerks refused to bury their beloved mascot. Clerks across the country asked that the dog receive the honor they considered he was due by being preserved and presented to the Post Office Department's headquarters." Owney's remains were preserved and sent for taxidermy. In 1904, Owney's effigy was displayed by the Postal Service at the St. Louis World's Fair. A commemorative silver spoon was commissioned by Cleveland, Ohio postal workers and fashioned by "Webb C. Ball Co. Cleveland.O."

Owney is the subject of an exhibit at the Smithsonian Museum. He was sent there in 1911, and has been called one of the museum's "most interesting" artifacts. His remains deteriorated over the intervening century, and were (along with associated artifacts) given an extensive makeover in 2011. One of the Smithsonian's employees opined the makeover a success, and called its culmination "the big reveal".

On July 27, 2011, the United States Postal Service issued a forever stamp honoring Owney. Artist Bill Bond said he wanted to render the dog "in a spirited and lively" presentation, and that he wound up working from the mounted remains, as numerous trips to dog parks left him uninspired. Owney was also honored locally at the Albany, New York post office. The stamp was also central to an augmented reality app for Windows, Apple iPhone, iPad 2 and iPod Touch.

Like his contemporary Australian counterpart Bob the Railway Dog active from 1881–1894 he was the subject of poetry. One was from a clerk in Detroit:

Owney is a tramp, as you can plainly see.
Only treat him kindly, and take him 'long wid ye."

Another was penned by a clerk in Minnesota:

"On'y one Owney, and this is he;
the dog is aloney, so let him be."

Owney has been the main character in five hardcover books, and one e-book published by the National Postal Museum (of the Smithsonian Institution) in 2012 titled, Owney: Tales from the Rails, written by Jerry Rees with songs by Stephen Michael Schwartz and illustrations by Fred Cline. The book is narrated and songs are performed by Trace Adkins. http://www.npm.si.edu/owneyebook/

See also
 Bob the Railway Dog
 List of individual dogs
 Sergeant Stubby, a Boston bull terrier, the most decorated war dog of World War I and the only dog to be nominated for rank and then promoted to sergeant through combat. Among other exploits, he is said to have captured a German spy. Also on display at the Smithsonian. He was also a mascot at Georgetown University.
 Station Jim – a popular and successful collector for the Widows' and Orphans' fund of the Great Western Railway.

Bibliography

Footnotes

Notes

Sources

 Free children's E-book narrated and sung by Trace Adkins.

External links 

 
 
 Owney images from Smithsonian Institution
 
 
 
 
  Free children's ebook narrated and sung by Trace Adkins. Free children's ebook narrated and sung by Trace Adkins

1887 animal births
1897 animal deaths
American mascots
Collection of the Smithsonian Institution
Dog mascots
Dog monuments
Missing or escaped animals
Postal history
Postal services
Postal systems
Rail transportation in the United States
United States Postal Service
Year of birth uncertain
Individual dogs in the United States
Individual taxidermy exhibits